Mugham or Mughamat is one of the many classical compositions from Azerbaijan, contrasting with tasnif and ashik.

It is a highly complex art form that weds classical poetry and musical improvisation in specific local modes. Mugham is a modal system. Unlike Western modes, "mugham" modes are associated not only with scales but with an orally transmitted collection of melodies and melodic fragments that performers use in the course of improvisation. Mugham is a compound composition of many parts. The choice of a particular mugham and a style of performance fits a specific event. The dramatic unfolding in performance is typically associated with increasing intensity and rising pitches, and a form of poetic-musical communication between performers and initiated listeners.

Three major schools of mugham performance existed from the late 19th and early 20th centuries in the regions of Karabakh, Shirvan, and Baku. The town of Shusha of Karabakh, was particularly renowned for this art.

A short selection of Azerbaijani mugham, played on the Azerbaijani wind instrument balaban, was included among many cultural achievements of humanity on the Voyager Golden Record, which was attached to the Voyager spacecraft to represent world music.

In 2003, UNESCO proclaimed Azerbaijani Mugham a "Masterpiece of the Oral and Intangible Heritage of Humanity". It was added to the UNESCO Intangible Cultural Heritage Lists in 2008.

History

In the course of its long history, the people of Azerbaijan have retained their ancient musical tradition. Mugham belongs to the system of modal music and may have derived from Persian musical tradition. The Uighurs in Xinjiang (新疆) call this musical development muqam, the Uzbeks and Tajiks call it maqom (or shasmaqom), while Arabs call it maqam and Persians dastgah.

The meta-ethnicity and intricate complexity of this music also becomes apparent in the fact that terms such as mugham, maqam, or dastgah, omnipresent in oriental music, can mean one thing in the Turkish tradition, while the same term in the music of Uzbekistan takes on quite another meaning, and yet another in the classical Arabic tradition. So, in one culture mugham may be related to a strictly fixed melodic type, while in another it is only the cadences, the melody endings that are associated with it. In a third culture it may only correspond to a specific type of tone scales.

The genre itself has roots in prayer and lullaby and is passed on from mother to baby in this way. However, there are hundreds of varieties, such as songs similar to war chant.

In the 16–17th centuries the art of mugham was passing through the development process as a folklore professional music of the palace conditions. In this period a dastgah form starts to develop in the structure and forms of mugham. New colors and shades as well as tasnifs developed in mugham performance. The masters of mugham of Azerbaijan sang gazals written in aruz genre by Fuzuli, Habibi and Khatai. The music events were held in most regions of today's Azerbaijan in the 19th century and mugham was performed at these events. In the 19th century famous French writer Alexandre Dumas who attended the ceremony in Shamakhy, wrote in his works about his trip saying he was greatly impressed by mugham that sounded there. Such events held in Azerbaijan were attended by khanendes from Karabakh, Baku and Tabriz which in turn caused the blending of singing traditions of different regions.

In the early decades of the 20th century, a member of native intelligentsia, Uzeyir Hajibeyov, the author of the first national opera Leyli and Majnun, also formulated the theoretical basis of Azerbaijani mugham in his work The Principles of Azerbaijan Folk Music. Famous Azerbaijani composer Gara Garayev and Fikrat Amirov also made a great contribution to the development of the art of mugham through creating the mugham symphony.

Hajibaba Huseynov was credited as a key figure in the popularization of mugham, and developing talented mugham khanandas such as Alim Qasimov, Aghakhan Abdullayev and Gadir Rustamov. As of 1985, Agdam Mugham School functions in Azerbaijan, which produced the "Karabakh Nightingales" mugham ensemble.

Azerbaijan also has a great tradition of composers and musicians of western classical music. Uzeyir Hajibeyov with his Leyli and Majnun created the genre of mugham-opera. Fikret Amirov (1922–1984) was the first composer of symphonic mughams, namely – Shur, Kurd Ovshari, and Gulistan Bayati Shiraz. Azerbaijani composers created a plethora of compositions that fused mugham and traditional European genres. Among those, for example, Vasif Adigozal's mugham oratorio Karabakh Shikastasi. Such works are obviously very different from traditional mugham formations but in fact incorporate many mugham idioms. On the level of musicians, there remains a strict separation between classical and "traditional" music in terms of training. Even if the musicians are educated at the same conservatorium they stick to one camp.

According to the New York Times, mugham is a symphonic-length suite, full of contrasting sections: unmetered and rhythmic, vocal and instrumental, lingering around a single sustained note or taking up a refrain that could be a dance tune.

In 2005, International Center of Mugham created under the decree of Azerbaijani president Ilham Aliyev. In August of same year, on the territory of the Baku Boulevard, Ilham Aliyev with his spouse, the Goodwill Ambassador of UNESCO Mehriban Aliyeva and UNESCO Director General Koichiro Matsuura, laid the first stone at the base of the complex. Opening of the complex took place on December 27, 2008. The total area of center is 7500 meters squared, which also includes concert saloon of 350 people, recording studio, rooms for rehearsals. In the foyer, visitors can find busts of famous mugham performers, also a rich collection of musical instruments.

The modes of mugham

In recent years, Azerbaijan folk music existed within the scope of folk art. The vocal-instrumental forms of folklore contain the elements of polyphony. The peculiarity of folk music clarifies itself firstly with the development of a modal system. It contains seven main modes – Rast, Shur, Segah (are especially common), Shushtar, Bayaty-Shiraz, Chahargah, Humayun and three collateral kinds – shahnaz, sarendj, chargah in some other form. Before, it was considered that each of the modes has its special vivid emotional meaning. Every mode represents a strongly organized scale, possessing a firm tonic prop (maye), and each step of the mode has its melodic function.

Zarbi mugham includes nine modes – Heyrati, Arazbari, Samayi-Shams, Mansuriyya, Mani, Ovshari, Heydari, Karabakh Shikastasi and Kasma Shikastasi.

Analysis 

Part of the confusion arises from the fact that the term itself can have two different, if related meanings. The famous Azerbaijani composer Gara Garayev has the following explanation: “The expression mugham is used in two senses in the folk music of Azerbaijan. On the one hand the word mugham describes the same thing as the term lad [Russian for key, mode, scale]. An analysis of Azerbaijani songs, dances and other folk-music forms show that they are always constructed according to one [of these] modes. On the other hand the term mugham refers to an individual, multi-movement form. This form combines elements of a suite and a rhapsody, is symphonic in nature, and has its own set of structural rules. In particular one should observe that the suite-rhapsody-mugham is constructed according to one particular mode-mugham and is subject to all of the particular requirements of this mode.” (Sovetskaya Muzyka 1949:3). Azerbaijani conservatory throughout the 20th century produced significant scholars and scholarship. Among them, Rena Mamedova explored the philosophical content of mugham, as an Azerbaijani "formula of creative thinking". Elkhan Babayev wrote extensively on rhythmic aspect of mugham performance. The native scholars continued and expanded Hajibeyov's analysis of mugham.

Mugham describes a specific type of musical composition and performance, which is hard to grasp with western concepts of music in another respect: for one, mugham composition is improvisational in nature. At the same time it follows exact rules. Furthermore, in the case of a suite-rhapsody-mugham the concept of improvisation is not really an accurate one, since the artistic imagination of the performers is based on a strict foundation of principles determined by the respective mode. The performance of mughams does therefore not present an amorphous and spontaneous, impulsive improvisation.

With respect to the concept of improvisation, mugham music is often put in relation to jazz, a comparison that is accurate to a certain point only. Although mugham does allow for a wide margin of interpretation, an equation with jazz is oversimplified, since it fails to account for the different kinds of improvisation for different Mugham modes. The performance of a certain mugham may last for hours. (For the uninitiated listener it is close to impossible to know whether a musician is actually improvising or playing a prearranged composition.) Furthermore, as Garayev stresses, mugham music has a symphonic character.

The songs are often based on the medieval and modern poetry of Azerbaijan, and although love is a common topic in these poems, to the uninitiated ear many of the intricacies and allusions are lost. For one, the poems do not primarily deal with worldly love but with the mystical love for god. Yet, strictly speaking, this is still secular music/poetry, as opposed to, say, Sufism. Nevertheless, mugham composition is designed very similarly to Sufism in that it seeks to achieve ascension from a lower level of awareness to a transcendental union with god. It is a spiritual search for god.

Derivatives and offshoots

Jazz mugham

The famous Azerbaijani jazz musician Vagif Mustafazadeh, who died in 1979, is credited with fusing jazz with mugham. Jazz mugham is jazz based on the modal forms or scales of mughams, just as a mugham symphonies are symphonies based on mughams. Ordinary jazz is marked by metered rhythm. But mugham jazz does not follow a metered system. Both rhythm and scales are improvised.

In recent years, interest to jazz mugham has seen rise in many western countries, particularly in the United States, Austria and Japan. In 1995, Jeff Buckley performed "What Will You Say" as a duet with Alim Qasimov at the Festival de la Musique Sacrée (Festival of Sacred Music) in France.

Cultural significance 

In 2003, UNESCO has acknowledged the authenticity, richness and cultural significance of mugham both national and global culture, and in 2003 announced it as a “Masterpiece of Oral and Intangible Cultural Heritage of Humanity”.

Considered to be the classical music of Azerbaijan, the mugham is a traditional musical form characterized by a large degree of improvisation and draws upon popular stories and local melodies. The recent evolution of the cultural industry has threatened the improvisational nature and the ear-to-ear transmission of this art form. During his official visit to the country in August 2005, the Director-General of UNESCO, in the company of President Ilham Aliyev and several Goodwill Ambassadors, attended a foundation stone-laying ceremony of a Mugham Centre. In 2004, Mehriban Aliyeva, the First Lady of Azerbaijan, was named as a UNESCO Goodwill Ambassador for the oral and musical traditions.

Since 2009, International World of Mugham Festival is held with the participations of famous artists from all over the world.

Social impact
The massive popularity of mugham resulted in a powerful impact on worldwide society. Many of mugham khanandas were known as country-loving, powerful, respectful characters, and mugham was popularly associated with sign of pain and hope during First Nagorno-Karabakh War.

Mugham has lived and sounded in Azerbaijan in all periods, independently on political, public and economic situation and reserved its place in Azerbaijani culture. The mugham masters play tremendous role in transition of mugham from generations to generations.

Notable Performers

Individuals

Female
 Malakkhanim Ayyubova
 Shovkat Alakbarova
 Konul Khasiyeva
 Sara Gadimova
 Gandab Guliyeva
 Sakina Ismayilova
 Tukezban Ismayilova
 Yaver Kelenterli
 Farghana Qasimova
 Nazakat Mammadova
 Rubaba Muradova
 Basti Sevdiyeva
 Jahan Talyshinskaya
 Nazaket Teymurova

Male

 Aghakhan Abdullayev
 Abulfat Aliyev
 Ahmed Agdamski
 Shakili Alasgar
 Janali Akbarov
 Gulu Asgarov
 Arif Babayev
 Bulbuljan
 Jabbar Garyagdyoglu
 Talat Gasimov
 Zahid Guliyev
 Hajibaba Huseynov
 Mansum Ibrahimov
 Kechachioghlu Muhammed
 Sabir Mirzayev
 Alibaba Mammadov
 Sakhavat Mammadov
 Yagub Mammadov
 Zabit Nabizadeh
 Alim Qasimov
 Islam Rzayev
 Gadir Rustamov
 Khan Shushinski
 Musa Shushinski
 Seyid Shushinski

Musicians
 Elnur Ahmadov
 Firuz Aliyev
 Habil Aliyev
 Firuz Aliyev
 Elchin Hashimov
 Sahib Pashazade
 Kamil Jalilov
 Mansur Mansurov
 Mazahir Mammadov
 Bahram Mansurov
 Gurban Pirimov
 Sadigjan

See also
 Franghiz Ali-Zadeh
 Vagif Mustafazadeh
 Aziza Mustafazadeh
 Music of Azerbaijan
 Culture of Azerbaijan
 History of Azerbaijan
 International Mugham Center of Azerbaijan
 Mugham triads

References

External links
 UNESCO proclaimes Mugham of Azerbaijan a Masterpiece of the Oral and Intangible Heritage of Humanity
 Mugham Society of America
 Declared Masterpiece of Oral World Heritage by UNESCO
 azer.com on Mugham
 Louis Werner about Mugham
 e-book "Principles of Azerbaijani Folk Music"

 
Azerbaijani music
Masterpieces of the Oral and Intangible Heritage of Humanity
Modes (music)
Classical and art music traditions
Azerbaijani inventions
Azerbaijani styles of music
Azerbaijani words and phrases
National symbols of Azerbaijan
Articles containing video clips
Contents of the Voyager Golden Record
Maqam-based music tradition